Josephine Skriver-Karlsen (born 14 April 1993) is a Danish model, known for her work with Victoria's Secret.

Early life
Skriver was born and raised Copenhagen, Denmark. Her mother is an IT analyst and her father is a marine biologist. Her mother is a lesbian and her father is gay; Skriver and her younger brother, Oliver, were conceived through IVF.

At the age of 15, Skriver was discovered and approached about her modeling potential while on a trip to New York with her soccer team. Shortly thereafter, she was signed by Unique Models, an international modeling agency based in Copenhagen. She was consequently approached by other agencies outside of Denmark, but decided to wait to stay in school. After finishing school, she began pursuing a modeling career in 2011.

Career 
Skriver's debut season was Fall/Winter 2011, during which she opened for Alberta Ferretti and closed for Prada. That season, she also walked for many other prominent designers, like Calvin Klein, Rag & Bone, Gucci, Dolce & Gabbana, Givenchy, Yves Saint Laurent, Valentino, Alexander McQueen, Balenciaga, DKNY and Christian Dior.

Throughout her career, she has done advertisement campaigns for brands such as H&M, Dior, Gucci, Bulgari, DKNY, Michael Kors, Balmain, MAC Cosmetics, Armani Exchange, Karen Millen, Max Mara, Topten, Tommy Hilfiger, Yves Saint Laurent Beauty, Caleres, Tom Ford, Shu Uemura, Andrew Marc, G-Shock, Victoria's Secret and she has been on the cover of and featured in editorials of numerous magazines such as Marie Claire, Vanity Fair, V magazine, Interview, L'Officiel, Vs., W, Allure, Italian, German, Russian, Chinese, Japanese, Australian, Brazilian, Spanish and American Vogue as well as Danish, Italian, Brazilian, Swedish, French Elle and British, Polish, Mexican, Arabian and American Harper's Bazaar, and more.

She has worked with Mario Testino for Michael Kors, Steven Meisel for Vogue Italia, Tim Walker for American Vogue, Greg Kadel for German Vogue, Terry Richardson for H&M and Patrick Demarchelier for Dior.

Skriver has appeared in catalogs and advertisements for Victoria's Secret and walked in the Victoria's Secret Fashion Show every consecutive year since 2013. In February 2016, it was announced that Skriver was officially one of the brand's contracted Angels, making her the first Danish Angel since Helena Christensen.

On January 22, 2020 Skriver was confirmed as the newest model for the 2020 Sports Illustrated Swimsuit Issue. She would win "Rookie of the Year" and return in 2021.

LGBT advocacy
In 2015, Skriver was made a celebrity ambassador for the Family Equality Council and its Outspoken Generation Program, which aims to raise awareness about LGBTQ families.

She has said that her ultimate goal is that her story will "not be that interesting soon, because that would mean that society has come to accept LGBT parents to be just as traditional and normal as any other way of having a family."

Personal life
Skriver has been in a relationship with American musician Alexander DeLeon since 2013; in November 2018, the couple announced their engagement. They married in April 2022 in Cabo San Lucas. As of 2022, they live together in Los Angeles. She is an avid fan of the NHL's Nashville Predators and the NFL's Las Vegas Raiders and can be frequently spotted at their games.

References

External links

 

1993 births
Living people
Danish female models
Danish women activists
Danish LGBT rights activists
People from Copenhagen
Danish expatriates in the United States
Victoria's Secret Angels
The Society Management models
Elite Model Management models
Women civil rights activists